Derek Stockalper (born March 4, 1984) is a former professional and international basketball player.

Early life 
Stockalper graduated from Carlsbad High School, where he became a first-team All-San Diego County player.

College career 
After initially spending his freshman year at San Diego, Stockalper transferred to MiraCosta College for his sophomore year, before transferring to California Polytechnic State University at San Luis Obispo for his final two seasons. The 6-foot-5, 220-pound Stockalper starred as a forward at Cal Poly, where he earned All-Big West Conference First Team selections in 2006 and 2007, and in the latter season led the Big West in both field-goal percentage (shooting .540) and 3-point percentage (.496). He majored in history at Cal Poly.

In 2009, ESPN picked Stockalper as the best player in Cal Poly history.

Pro career 
Stockalper played for the Lugano Tigers club from 2007 through 2018.

International career 
Stockalper played for the Switzerland National Team from 2007 to 2013. He made 23 career appearances for the Swiss in EuroBasket tournaments, averaging a career-best 12.7 points in 2011.

References

Living people
1984 births
Swiss men's basketball players